Eno Onthara is a 2010 Indian Kannada-language romantic comedy film directed by "Mussanje" Mahesh and produced by M. Chandrashekar under the Udayachandra Productions banner. The film stars Ganesh in lead role. The soundtrack was composed by V. Harikrishna. This film is a remake of Tamil film Kushi.

Plot
Surya (Ganesh) is a student in a college in Mysore. He develops a close relationship with his classmate Madhumathi (Priyamani) after seeing her confident nature. But their ego-centric nature makes them stay apart always. Once both struggle to unite their friends Shanthi and Prasad, who are in love. What happens to their own love story will form the climax of the film.

Cast
 Ganesh as Surya
 Priyamani as Madhumathi
 Srinivasa Murthy
 Jai Jagadish
 Dhandapani
 Sharan as Dance master
 Tejaswini
 Padma Vasanthi
 Vijayalakshmi Singh
 Sathish Ninasam

Soundtrack

Reception

Critical response 

Shruti Indira Lakshminarayana of Rediff.com scored the film at 1.5 out of 5 stars and says "The dialogues lack punch and the music is not out of the box, barring Dil Kush, which is soothing. A film that could have been an ideal family entertainer lands up being an outdated attempt. Eno Onthara has nothing fresh to offer even to Ganesh's fans. The wait for this film was definitely not worth it". A critic from The Times of India scored the film at 3 out of 5 and wrote "Ganesh steals the show with his sterling performance. Priyamani is equally impressive. Srinivasamurthy is excellent while Sharan impresses one with some good moves as a dance master. Music by V Harikrishna is okay". Arun Seshadri from Deccan Herald wrote "Madhu and Surya who study in the same college manage to become friends but viewers need to wait till the very end for them to express their love. Sharan provides some comic relief but is no way close to Vivek in his role as dancemaster of the troop. Music by R P Patnaik is passable".

Box-office

Eno Onthara opened to mixed and negative reviews from critics who termed the film to be "Too faithful to the original..and outdated" given that the original version was released ten years before and was declared flop.

Home media
The movie was released on DVD with 5.1 channel surround sound and English subtitles and VCD.

References

External links
 

2010 films
2010s Kannada-language films
Kannada remakes of Tamil films
Films scored by V. Harikrishna
Films shot in Delhi